A Partnership for National Unity (APNU) is a left-wing political alliance in Guyana.

History
The APNU was formed in July 2011 in order to contest the 2011 general elections, consisting of the Guyana Action Party, the Guyana Association of Local Authorities, the Guyana National Congress, the Guyana People's Partnership, the Guyana Youth Congress, the Justice for All Party, the National Democratic Front, the National Front Alliance, the People's National Congress (PNC) and the Working People's Alliance.

The alliance won 26 of the 65 seats in the National Assembly in the elections. With the Alliance for Change winning seven seats, the combined opposition parties held a majority of seats in the National Assembly. However, the People's Progressive Party (which had won 32 seats) formed the government as the leader of the largest party automatically became President.

Prior to the 2015 elections, the APNU formed a joint electoral list with the Alliance for Change. The combined list won 33 seats, allowing PNC leader David A. Granger to become President.

In 2020, after a controversial election in which the APNU, as part of the APNU/AFC coalition, sought to win through altered poll results, the APNU was defeated and saw the Justice For All Party (JFAP) and Working People's Alliance (WPA) withdraw from the alliance. This withdrawal came after there was lack of representation on their parliamentary list for the opposition.

References

External links
Official website
APNU+AFC website

2011 establishments in Guyana
Left-wing political party alliances
Political parties established in 2011
Political party alliances in Guyana